Oat necrotic mottle virus (ONMV) is a plant pathogenic virus of the family Potyviridae.

External links
 ICTVdB - The Universal Virus Database: Oat necrotic mottle virus
 Family Groups - The Baltimore Method

Viral plant pathogens and diseases
Potyviridae